Arsalan Budazhapov is a Russian-born Kyrgyzstani freestyle wrestler. He won one of the bronze medals in the men's 79kg event at the 2022 World Wrestling Championships held in Belgrade, Serbia. He is also a two-time medalist, including gold, at the Asian Wrestling Championships.

Career 

He competed in the men's 79 kg event at the 2020 Individual Wrestling World Cup held in Belgrade, Serbia. In 2021, he failed to qualify for the 2020 Summer Olympics at the World Qualification Tournament held in Sofia, Bulgaria. He competed in the 79 kg event at the 2021 World Wrestling Championships held in Oslo, Norway where he was eliminated in his first match.

In 2022, he won one of the bronze medals in his event at the Yasar Dogu Tournament held in Istanbul, Turkey. He also competed at the 2021 Islamic Solidarity Games held in Konya, Turkey.

Achievements

References

External links
 

Living people
1993 births
Sportspeople from Zabaykalsky Krai
Kyrgyzstani male sport wrestlers
World Wrestling Championships medalists
Asian Wrestling Championships medalists
Islamic Solidarity Games competitors for Kyrgyzstan
21st-century Kyrgyzstani people
21st-century Russian people